The followers of Jainism are a minority community in Nepal. According to the 2011 Nepalese census, there are 3,214 Jains in Nepal, down from 4,108 in 2001. There is a Jain temple in Kathmandu, Nepal.

History
Bhadrabahu, the last Jain ascetic to have complete knowledge of Jain scriptures, was in Nepal for a 12-year penitential vow when the Pataliputra conference took place in 300 BCE to put together the Jain canon anew.

Jain society
The Jain society inaugurated the Lord Mahaveer Jain Niketan in 1979. The pratishtha for the Jain temple was performed in 1996.

Large number of Jains live in Morang (970 people), Kathmandu (829 people),  Sunsari District (388 people), Jhapa (248 people) and Saptari (188 people).

Jain unity
Jains in Nepal practice Jain unity, akin to American Jain unity, Digambar or Svetambara, speaking any language could become a member and carry out Jain religious activities, keeping to fundamental principles of Jainism. The Jain temple consists of different floors for different sects.

See also 

 Religion in Nepal

References

External links
 Nepal Jain temple

Nepal
Religion in Nepal
Jain communities
Nepal